"Dub Yalil" is a world music song performed by Belgian singer Natacha Atlas. The melody and additional lyrics (the words to the "Adhan" - or Islamic call to prayer - are used in the first half of the song) were written by Atlas and produced by Transglobal Underground for the Atlas' debut album Diaspora (1995). It was released as a single in 1994.

Background and meaning
In "Dub Yalil", Atlas professes her love for Allah. The song was written during a period when Atlas was rediscovering her faith in Islam. She began attending the mosque and fasted during the month of Ramadan. "Dub Yalil" features the opening lines of the Adhan, the Muslim call to prayer, over a dub beat. The song begins with her singing "God is greatest, I witness that there is no god but God," but does not complete the prayer's opening line, which should be followed by "and Muhammad is the Messenger of God." Instead, Atlas sings, "God, I love you."

Formats and track listings
These are the formats and track listings of major single releases of "Dub Yalil".
 
CD single
(NR28CD)
 "Dub Yalil" (Alternate version) – 6:39
 "Yalla Chant" (Album version) – 6:01
 "Stotinki" (The Space Cadets featuring Natacha Atlas and Jah Wobble) – 5:23

Vinyl single
(NR28T)
 "Dub Yalil" – 5:36
 "Yalla Chant" – 6:01

Personnel
The following people contributed to "Dub Yalil":

Natacha Atlas – lead vocals, keyboards
Aggie Demitri – guitar
Kevin Haskins – programming, drums, percussion, synthesizer
Aki Nawaz – samples
Angus Wallace – engineering

References
General

Specific

External links
Official website

1994 debut singles
Arabic-language songs
Electronic songs
Natacha Atlas songs
1994 songs
Songs written by Natacha Atlas